The 1982 Minnesota gubernatorial election took place on November 2, 1982. Minnesota Democratic–Farmer–Labor Party candidate Rudy Perpich defeated Independent-Republican Party challenger Wheelock Whitney, Jr. Warren Spannaus unsuccessfully ran for the Democratic nomination, while Lou Wangberg and Harold Stassen unsuccessfully ran for the Republican nomination.

Results

External links
 http://www.sos.state.mn.us/home/index.asp?page=653
 http://www.sos.state.mn.us/home/index.asp?page=657

Minnesota
Gubernatorial
1982